Preussia can refer to:

Preussia (fungus),  a genus of fungi
Preussia (katydid), a genus of bush crickets or katydids in the family Tettigoniidae, subfamily Phaneropterinae